"There's a Reason Why (I Never Returned Your Calls)" is a song performed by English rock band Blossoms. The song was released as a single in the United Kingdom on 25 April 2018 by Virgin EMI Records as the second single from their second studio album Cool Like You. The song has peaked at number 95 on the UK Singles Chart and number 81 on the Scottish Singles Chart.

Music video
A music video to accompany the release of "There's a Reason Why (I Never Returned Your Calls)" was first released onto YouTube on 27 April 2018. The music video was directed by Masashi Muto and was filmed in Tokyo. The video was inspired by The Beatles' famous 1964 musical film. When talking about the video, the band said, "We took influence from The Beatles’ A Hard Day’s Night  and tried to capture the camaraderie between us a band of friends. [...] When we wanted to make a video overseas somewhere, it was always going to be Tokyo. We loved being chased around the streets and It made five lads from Stockport feel like the Beatles for a day."

Track listing

Charts

Certifications

Release history

References

2018 songs
2018 singles
Virgin EMI Records singles
Blossoms (band) songs